Martin Pieter Zandvliet  (born 7 January 1971 in Fredericia) is a Danish film director and screenwriter.

Career 

Zandvliet originally began as an editor, before writing and directing the documentary Angels of Brooklyn in 2002. His first major picture was Applause in 2009, which received wide praise. He then wrote and directed A Funny Man, based on the life of Danish actor and comedian Dirch Passer. In 2015 he wrote and directed Land of Mine, which received almost universal acclaim at home, with many calling it the best Danish film that year, the film was furthermore nominated for the Academy Award for Best Foreign Language Film at the 89th Academy Awards.

Filmography

Awards and nominations

References

External links

1971 births
Living people
Danish film directors
People from Fredericia